Liam Deois (aka Liam Joyce), fl. early 19th century, was a highwayman who lived at Gleann 'a Ghadaí (valley of the robbers), Ballybackagh, some four miles north-west of Athenry, Co Galway, Ireland. Locally described as a big man and feared by his neighbours, Deois robbed people going to and from the Galway market, usually in the area between Cúinne Geal - near what is now Carnmore Airport - to Cussaun Cross on the Galway-Monivea road. He would escape pursuit at his hideout at a place now known as Poll Liam Deois. During the summer months,  he targeted people on the road from Merlin Park to Renmore, just outside Galway. 

Deois was finally captured at the Cúinne Geal in the following circumstances: 

His fate is unknown. Antoine Ó Raifteiri mentioned Casán Liam Deois in a poem about the musician Tomás Daly of nearby Coshla.

References
 The Lamberts of Athenry, ed. Finnbarr O'Regan, Galway, 1999.
 The Tribes of Galway, Adrian James Martyn, 2001.

People from County Galway
19th-century Irish people
Irish highwaymen
Year of birth unknown
Year of death unknown
People from Athenry